Christopher Norbury (born 14 August 1986) is an English former professional snooker player. He began his professional career by playing Challenge Tour in 2003, at the time the second-level professional tour. Norbury first entered Main Tour for the 2005–06 season, after finishing the 2004/05 Challenge Tour Rankings on the rank 5. He played in the latter stages of the Paul Hunter Classic in both 2008 and 2009, losing in the first round to Shaun Murphy 4–1 in 2008, and losing to Dave Harold 4–2 in 2009.

He runs Elite Snooker Club in Lostock Hall, Lancashire along with fellow professional player, Shokat Ali.

Personal life

Chris supports his local football, team Accrington Stanley. Chris is married.

Performance and rankings timeline

References

External links

Profile on Global Snooker
Profile on Pro Snooker Blog

Living people
English snooker players
1986 births
People from Accrington